Terry Scott (1927–1994) was an English actor and comedian.

Terry Scott may also refer to:

 Terry Scott (athlete) (born 1964), American sprinter
 Terry Scott (priest) (born 1956), Anglican minister
 Terry D. Scott, United States Navy sailor

See also
 Terri Scott, principal of Northern Regional College, Northern Ireland
 Terrence Scott (born 1986), Canadian football wide receiver